Verrucaria hydrophila is a species of saxicolous (rock-dwelling), crustose lichen in the family Verrucariaceae. Found in freshwater habitats in Europe, it was formally described as a new species in 2013 by lichenologist Alan Orange. The type specimen was collected by the author from Melindwr, Coed y Fron Wyllt (Bontuchel, Wales), where it was found in a woodland growing on a shaded stone in a stream. The lichen has a thin, smooth, grey-green to brownish thallus that is somewhat translucent when wet. It is widespread in Europe and the British Isles, where it grows on rocks and stones in streams and seepages; the species epithet refers to its semi-aquatic habitat.

See also
List of Verrucaria species

References

hydrophila
Lichen species
Lichens described in 2013
Lichens of Europe
Taxa named by Alan Orange